High Lonesome may refer to:

Books
High Lonesome: New & Selected Stories, 1966–2006, a short story collection by Joyce Carol Oates
High Lonesome, a 1962 Western novel by Louis L'Amour
High Lonesome, a 1996 short story collection by Barry Hannah

Films
High Lonesome (film), a 1950 Western film directed by Alan Le May
A Father for Charlie, also released as High Lonesome, a 1995 television film directed by Jeff Bleckner

Places
 Coeur d'Alene Mountains, part of the Bitterroot Mountain Range in the Rocky Mountains of North America

Music
High lonesome, a genre of bluegrass music pioneered by Bill Monroe
 The High Lonesome, a country band whose lead singer was Larry Poindexter
 High Lonesome, an indie rock band named after the short story collection by Barry Hannah

Albums
High Lonesome (Randy Travis album), a 1991 album by Randy Travis
High Lonesome (Charlie Daniels album), a 1976 album by Charlie Daniels Band
High Lonesome (Country Gentlemen album)
High Lonesome, a 1999 album by Longview

Songs
"High Lonesome", a song by Avail from their 2000 album One Wrench
"High Lonesome", a song by The Gaslight Anthem from their 2008 album The '59 Sound
"High Lonesome", a song by Jesse Malin from his 2003 album The Fine Art of Self Destruction
"High Lonesome", a song by Caspian from their 2012 album Waking Season